() is a village, community and electoral ward in Gwynedd, northwest Wales, on the southern bank of the lake  and at the foot of Snowdon, the highest mountain in Wales. It is a centre for outdoor activities in Snowdonia, including walking, mountaineering, climbing, mountain biking and pony trekking, as well as water sports such as scuba diving. The community includes Nant Peris.

History

The ruins of  Castle, which were painted by Richard Wilson and J. M. W. Turner, stand above the village. The 13th century fortress was built by  the Great and is a grade I listed building.

In the 18th century  was the home of the legendary strong woman Marged ferch Ifan.

Demographics

Languages 
According to the United Kingdom Census 2021, 69.5 per cent of all usual residents aged 3+ in Llanberis can speak Welsh. 79.6 per cent of the population noted that they could speak, read, write or understand Welsh. The 2011 census noted 74.7 per cent of all usual residents aged 3 years and older in the village could speak Welsh.

As of October 2018, approximately 56 per cent of pupils in the village's primary school (Ysgol Dolbadarn) spoke Welsh at home.

Country of birth 
The 2021 Census noted that 96.6 per cent of Llanberis' population was born in the United Kingdom. The 2011 Census noted that 97.2 per cent of the population was born in the United Kingdom; 73.6 per cent of the population was born in Wales and 22.4 percent of the population born in England.

Identity 
According to the 2011 Census, 67.4 per cent of the population noted that they had Welsh-only national identity, with 26.1 per cent noting that they had no Welsh national identity at all. According to the 2021 Census, 64.8 per cent of the population noted that they had Welsh-only national identity.

Local attractions
Places of interest in and near the village include the Snowdon Mountain Railway, the National Slate Museum, the  Lake Railway,  country park and Electric Mountain. Tours of  Power Station are also available from a purpose-built visitor centre.

The village is a common starting point for ascents of Snowdon along the  Path. Although it is the longest route, it is the least strenuous ascent, largely following the line of the Snowdon Mountain Railway. This makes it the most popular walking route on the mountain.

 Castle, a fortification built by the Welsh prince  the Great during the early 13th century, is located at the base of the  Pass. The castle was important militarily and as a symbol of 's power and authority. It features a large stone keep, which historian Richard Avent considers "the finest surviving example of a Welsh round tower". In the 18th and 19th century it was a popular destination for painters interested in Sublime and Picturesque landscapes.

 Mountain Rescue Team deals with 150–200 incidents a year and is one of the busiest mountain rescue teams in the country. The team is run entirely by volunteers who rely solely on donations from the public for funding.

 Mountain Film Festival, which is held in annually in February, began in 2004. It was placed on hiatus in 2019 due to a lack of funding.

It is the home of the Slateman Triathlon which runs in early summer each year. It attracts over 2,000 triathletes and many more spectators over two days. It is also the start and finish of the Snowdonia Marathon

Transport

Former operator Padarn Bus, which went into receivership in 2014, was based in the town and ran several routes to it, including a number of open-top routes.

The village used to be served by  railway station on a branch line of the Carnarvonshire Railway. Passenger services ceased in 1932; freight continued until closure in 1964. The heritage Snowdon Mountain Railway and  Lake Railway both have stations in the town, but serve primarily as tourist attractions rather than local transport links.

Notable people 
 Griffith Williams (1769–1838), bardic name Gutyn Peris, a Welsh language poet, brought up in Llanberis
 Annie Foulkes (1877-1962) a writer and teacher of French.
 Thomas Rowland Hughes (1903–1949), broadcaster, dramatist and poet.
 Marc Lloyd Williams (born 1973) a former footballer with 576 club caps and the Welsh Premier League's all-time top scorer with 319 goals; brought up in Llanberis

Gallery

See also
  Pass
 St 's Church,

References

External links

 Llanberis' Website
 Llanberis Tourism
 Llanberis Mountain Rescue – Online home of the country's busiest mountain rescue team
 www.geograph.co.uk : photos of Llanberis and surrounding area

Llanberis
Villages in Gwynedd